The Reid and Sigrist R.S.1 Snargasher was a British twin-engined, three-seat advanced trainer developed in the Second World War.

Design and development
Reid and Sigrist in Desford, Leicester, United Kingdom, were an important instrument manufacturer in the interwar era, specialising in aircraft applications leading to the forming of an aviation division in 1937 at New Malden, Surrey factory site. The first product was a unique twin-engined advanced trainer powered by a pair of de Havilland Gipsy Six II (205 hp, 152 kW) engines. Although basically a conventional mid-wing "taildragger" design with mainly wooden construction (the tail surfaces were fabric covered), the fuselage/wing surfaces had plywood covering, and the cockpit featured a sliding canopy for the three-seat configuration, that was in vogue at the time for training. An alternate light bomber configuration was also proposed with a pilot and radio operator/navigator in the front compartment and a rear-facing gunner position behind equipped with a single machine gun.

Operational history
The prototype, registered as G-AEOD on 9 October 1936, had its first flight early in 1939 with Reid and Sigrist test pilot George E. Lowdell at the controls. The R.S.1 named whimsically "Snargasher" by the factory workers during its construction (the name which was eventually formally adapted had no meaning other than as a "family joke") made its first public appearance at the Heathrow Garden Party of the Royal Aeronautical Society on 15 May 1939 with its Certificate of Airworthiness issued on 3 June 1939.

Further development of the type was suspended as the company became a wartime engineering and production concern with Bolton-Paul Defiant and Hawker Hurricane assembly and repair contracts. The R.S.1 was used as a communications aircraft by Reid and Sigrist, retaining its civil registration but flying in green/brown camouflage until the sole prototype was broken up in 1944. By that point, a more definitive development had been started, the R.S.3 "Desford" which was intended for postwar use.

Specifications (R.S.1)

References

Notes

Bibliography
 Gunston, Bill. Back to the Drawing Board: Aircraft That Flew, but Never Took Off. London: Zenith Imprint, 1996. .
 Swanborough, Gordon. British Aircraft at War, 1939–1945. East Sussex, UK: HPC Publishing, 1997. .

1930s British military trainer aircraft
1939 establishments in the United Kingdom
Twin-tail aircraft